The 2020 La Course by Le Tour de France was the seventh edition of La Course by Le Tour de France, a women's cycling race held in France. It took place on 29 August 2020 and was the fourth event on the 2020 UCI Women's World Tour. The event was organised by ASO, which also organises the Tour de France. Originally, the event was supposed held on 19 July, but was postponed due to the COVID-19 pandemic in France.

Route 
The race started and finished in Nice, taking in two laps of a hilly circuit covering  in total. It was held before stage 1 of the men's 2020 Tour de France, which took in three laps of the same circuit. 

The original route for the race would have taken place in Paris featuring circuits along the Champs-Élysées, a choice that was criticised by the professional peloton.

Teams
Eight UCI Women's WorldTeams and fifteen UCI Women's Continental Teams made up the twenty-three teams that competed in the race. Of the 136 riders in the race, only 62 finished, while a further 51 riders finished over the time limit.

UCI Women's WorldTeams

 
 
 
 
 
 
 
 

UCI Women's Continental Teams

Results

Prize money
The total amount of prize money for the 2020 edition of the race was €20,000 The majority of the prize money was allocated according to the final result. 

In addition to the 20 first finishers, there were also prizes in the Queen of the Mountains classification (€300, €200, and €100 for the first 3 riders on each of the two climbs) and a €2000 prize for the most combative competitor which was won by Annemiek van Vleuten.

See also
 2020 in women's road cycling

References

External links
 

2020 UCI Women's World Tour
2020
2020 in French sport
La Course
La Course, 2020